In 1997, a cache of documents were discovered, purportedly proving an affair between President John F. Kennedy and Marilyn Monroe, as well as other illicit relationships, but were later determined to have been part of an elaborate hoax. Lawrence X. "Lex" Cusack had forged the documents under the guise that they had belonged to his father, an attorney who represented Monroe's mother Gladys Baker Eley as well as the Archdiocese of New York. Investigative journalist Seymour Hersh had vouched for the authenticity of the documents, with the original manuscript of his 1997 book The Dark Side of Camelot including many statements that were sourced from them. After the hoax came to light, Hersh removed the material shortly before publication. Before the scandal broke, there were also plans for an ABC-backed TV special or film.

A month before the publication of The Dark Side of Camelot, newspapers, including USA Today, reported Hersh had announced the removal from the galleys at the last minute a segment about legal documents allegedly containing JFK's signature. The documents supposedly signed by John F. Kennedy included a provision, in 1960, for a trust fund to be set up for the institutionalized mother of Marilyn Monroe. A paralegal named Lawrence X. "Lex" Cusack had shared them with Hersh and encouraged the author to discuss them in the book. Doubts were raised among ABC investigators about inconsistencies in the documents, which included the use of typefaces created well after they were allegedly written, and the use of ZIP codes before their introduction on July 1, 1963 (a year after Monroe's death). Led by Peter Jennings, ABC employees confronted Cusack with these inconsistencies on live television, but Cusack maintained the documents were authentic, and launched legal action (which subsequently collapsed).

Shortly before Hersh's announcement that he had removed all references to Cusack's documents, federal investigators began probing Cusack's sale of the documents. Cusack was arrested, and a grand jury indicted him on 13 fraud and forgery charges. He was convicted on all counts by a jury and sentenced to nine years and seven months in federal prison: Judge Denise L. Cote also ordered Cusack to forfeit the forged documents and $7 million in proceeds from their sale. In 1997, the Kennedy family also denied Cusack's claim that his late father had been an attorney who had represented JFK in 1960.

Later coverage
The story was featured on the February 11, 2011, episode of This American Life.

References

Hoaxes in the United States
John F. Kennedy
Marilyn Monroe
Literary forgeries
1997 hoaxes
1997 in the United States